Stanley Kuhl Hornbeck (May 4, 1883 – December 10, 1966) was an American professor and diplomat. A Rhodes scholar and the author of eight books, he had a thirty-year career in government service. He was chief of the State Department Division of Far Eastern Affairs (1928–1937), a special adviser to Secretary of State Cordell Hull (1937–1944), and ambassador to the Netherlands (1944–1947).

Background
Hornbeck was born in Franklin, Massachusetts, the son of a Methodist minister, and studied at the University of Colorado and the University of Denver. He also attended University of Oxford as the first Rhodes Scholar from Colorado from 1904 to 1907, before receiving his Doctor of Philosophy from the University of Wisconsin in 1911 under Paul Reinsch. His dissertation discussed most favored nation clauses in economic treaties.

Career

China
Hornbeck taught in various institutions in China from 1909 to 1913, beginning at Hangchow University. In 1916, he published his first book on politics in China and Japan, Contemporary Politics in the Far East, which was widely disseminated.

He was in China during the Xinhai revolution, though did not see any battles. Hornbeck was a major proponent of Open Door Policy.

WWI
During World War I, the future ambassador served in army ordnance and military intelligence as a captain; later, in the Army Reserve, he would become a colonel.

Diplomacy
Hornbeck continued to be a major proponent of Open Door Policy. In 1935 he stated the policy had to be maintained as conceding it would be conceding China to Japan, considering the danger of the formation of Manchukuo.

In November 1941, contemptuous of the Japanese capacity to challenge US strength, Hornbeck dismissed the fears of a young Foreign Service officer, Charles W. Yost, that Japan might initiate war out of desperation over the oil embargo imposed by the United States. Then, ten days before the attack on Pearl Harbor, after drafting with Secretary of State Cordell Hull a hardline memo laying down conditions for relaxation of the sanctions, Hornbeck wagered that Japan would relent and that war was not imminent. The note that Hull sent the Japanese on November 26, 1941, said that Japan would have to withdraw from Southeast Asia and China before the United States would resume the oil shipments. Confident that his tough approach would cause Japan to back down, Hornbeck wrote in a memorandum the following day:

For more than a decade, Hornbeck had urged the United States to pursue a policy of economic pressure on Japan. Although Hornbeck had been derided by historians for his ill-founded wager, some observers argue that he understood as well as any other US policymaker at the time the irreconcilable conflict between Japan and US interests. Some observers believe that had his recommendations been followed much earlier, Japanese power would have been significantly weakened.

Hiss case
On September 2, 1948, Hornbeck wrote a letter to Alger Hiss as follows:

William L. Marbury, Jr., Hiss's attorney in his libel suit against Whittaker Chambers, noted "Alger had been working for Hornbeck during the time when he had been meeting with General Clay on problems relating to China, and I was, therefore, especially interested in what Hornbeck had to say."

Later life
In 1954, Horneck was awarded a Guggenheim Fellowship for his contributions to Far East studies and political science.

Death
Stanley Kuhl Hornbeck died age 83 in December 1966, in Washington, D.C.

References and further reading

Notes

External sources
Kenneth B. Pyle (2007); Japan Rising. PublicAffairs. 
Hoover Institution Archives: Stanley Hornbeck papers

1883 births
1966 deaths
People from Franklin, Massachusetts
Ambassadors of the United States to the Netherlands
Writers from Massachusetts